China Airlines Flight 611  was a regularly scheduled passenger flight from Chiang Kai-shek International Airport (now Taoyuan International Airport) in Taiwan to Hong Kong International Airport in Hong Kong. The in-flight break-up was caused by metal fatigue cracks resulting from improper repairs to the aircraft 22 years earlier. As of 2022, the crash remains the deadliest in Taiwanese history, as well as the most recent accident involving fatalities for either 747 passenger flights or for China Airlines.

Aircraft 
The aircraft involved, registration  (originally registered as B-1866), MSN 21843, was the only Boeing 747-200 passenger aircraft left in the China Airlines fleet at the time. It was delivered to the airline in 1979, and had logged more than 64,800 hours of flight time at the time of the accident. The aircraft had a 274-seat configuration. Prior to the crash, China Airlines had sold B-18255 to Orient Thai Airlines for US$1.45 million. The accident flight was to be the aircraft's penultimate flight for China Airlines, as it was scheduled to be delivered to Orient Thai Airlines after its return flight from Hong Kong to Taipei. The contract to sell the aircraft was voided after the crash and Orient Thai replaced the original aircraft it supposed to be acquired with another 747 after the crash.

Only four passenger 747-200s were delivered to China Airlines, all from 1979 to 1980. The other three had been in full passenger service until 1999, when they were converted to freighters. They were immediately grounded by the ROC's Civil Aviation Administration (CAA) after the crash for maintenance checks.

Flight and disaster 
The flight took off at 15:08 local time (07:08 UTC), and was scheduled to arrive at Hong Kong at 16:28 HKT (08:28 UTC). The flight crew consisted of 51-year-old Captain Yi Ching-Fong, 52-year-old First Officer Shieh Yea Shyong, and 54-year-old Flight Engineer Chao Sen Kuo. All three pilots were highly experienced – both pilots had more than 10,100 hours of flying time and the flight engineer had logged more than 19,100 flight hours.

At 15:33, contact with the plane was lost. Chang Chia-juch, the Taiwanese Vice Minister of Transportation and Communications at that time, said that two Cathay Pacific aircraft in the area received B-18255's emergency location-indicator signals. All 206 passengers and 19 crew members on board the aircraft died.

Passengers 
The passengers included a former legislator and two reporters from the United Daily News. Most of the passengers, 114 people, were members of a Taiwanese group tour to the mainland organized by four travel agencies. One of the passengers on board was Taiwanese politician You Jih-cheng.

Of the 225 passengers and crew on board, remains of 175 were recovered and identified. The first 82 bodies were found floating on the ocean surface of the Taiwan Strait, and were recovered by fishing boats and military vessels. Contracted recovery vessels were subsequently used for the recovery of the aircraft wreckage and the remaining bodies.

The victims were identified by visual identification, personal effects, fingerprints, dental examinations, and through DNA testing. Only the three recovered flight crew member bodies were autopsied. The victims' bodies were photographed and their clothing and possessions were cataloged and returned to the victim's families. The victims' records, including body diagrams, injury protocols, photographs, and other documents related to the recovery and identification of the individuals were then correlated for each identified victim.

Most of the victims had extensive injuries consistent with head trauma, tibia and fibula fractures, significant back abrasions, and pelvic injuries. Most of the bodies were nearly intact except, in some cases, for fractured bones. Some of the victims had expansion of lung tissue, subcutaneous emphysema, and bleeding of the nose and mouth. No carbon remains were found on any of the recovered bodies or their clothes, and no sign of fire, burning, or blast damage was found.

Search, recovery and investigation 

Oil slicks were also spotted at 17:05; the first body was found at 18:10. Searchers recovered 15% of the wreckage, including part of the cockpit, and found no signs of burns, explosives, or gunshots.

No distress signal or communication was sent out prior to the crash. Radar data suggest that the aircraft broke into four pieces while at FL 350. The items included magazines, documents, luggage, photographs, Taiwan dollars, aircraft safety cards and a China Airlines-embossed, blood-stained pillow case.

Shortly before the breakup, two of the aircraft's four engines began providing slightly higher thrust, which was later found to have been within the normal ranges of deviation. All four engines were recovered from the sea and found not to have suffered any malfunction prior to the crash. Pieces of the aircraft were found in the ocean and on Taiwan, including in the city of Changhua.

The governments of Taiwan and the People's Republic of China co-operated in the recovery of the aircraft; the Chinese allowed personnel from Taiwan to search for bodies and aircraft fragments in those parts of the Taiwan Strait controlled by the People's Republic of China.

China Airlines requested relatives to submit blood samples for DNA testing at the Criminal Investigation Bureau of National Police Administration (now National Police Agency) and two other locations.

The United Daily News stated that some relatives of passengers described the existence of this flight to Hong Kong as being "unnecessary". Most of the passengers intended to arrive in mainland China, but because of a lack of direct air links between Taiwan and mainland China, the travelers had to fly via Hong Kong; the relatives advocated the opening of direct air links between Taiwan and mainland China, which was eventually realized.

Cause 

The final investigation report found that the accident was the result of fatigue cracking caused by inadequate maintenance after a much earlier tailstrike incident.  On 7 February 1980, the aircraft was flying from Stockholm Arlanda Airport to Taoyuan International Airport via King Abdulaziz International Airport and Kai Tak International Airport as China Airlines Flight 009 (Callsign "DYNASTY 009"). While landing in Hong Kong, part of the plane's tail had scraped along the runway. The aircraft was depressurized, ferried back to Taiwan on the same day, and a temporary repair done the day after. A more permanent repair was conducted by a team from China Airlines from 23 May through 26 May 1980.

The permanent repair of the tailstrike was not carried out in accordance with the Boeing Structural Repair Manual (SRM). According to the SRM, repairs could be made by replacing the entire affected skin or by cutting out the damaged portion and installing a reinforcing doubler plate to restore the structural strength. Rather than following the SRM, the China Airlines team installed a doubler over the damaged skin.

Though the kind of damage inflicted on the tail was far beyond the damage that a doubler plate is meant to fix, this accident probably would not have occurred had the doubler been installed properly. This would mean that all of the scratches would be completely contained by the innermost row of fasteners, and the fasteners themselves would be strong enough to stop the propagation of any new and existing fatigue cracks. However, the doubler that was installed on the aircraft was too small, so it failed to completely and effectively cover the damaged area, as scratches were found at, and outside, the outermost row of fasteners securing the doubler. Installing the doubler with scratches remaining outside the rivets provided no protection against the propagation of any concealed cracks beneath the doubler, or worse, in the area between its perimeter and the rows of rivets.

Consequently, after repeated cycles of pressurization and depressurization during flight, cracks began to form around the exposed scratches. Finally, on 25 May 2002, coincidentally 22 years to the day after the faulty repair was made on the damaged tail, the hull broke open in midair. An explosive decompression occurred once the crack opened up, causing the separation of the aircraft's fuselage at section 46 (aft of the main wingbox). After this point, the wings and fuselage forward of the initial breakpoint remained connected until impact with the sea.

This was not the first time that a 747 had crashed because of a faulty repair following a tailstrike. On 12 August 1985, 17 years before Flight 611's crash and 7 years after the accident aircraft's repair, Japan Airlines Flight 123 from Tokyo to Osaka with 524 people on board had crashed when the vertical stabilizer was torn off and the hydraulic systems severed by explosive decompression, leaving only four survivors. That crash had been attributed to a faulty repair to the rear pressure bulkhead, which had been damaged in 1978 in a tailstrike incident. In both crashes, a doubler plate was not installed according to Boeing standards.

China Airlines disputed much of the report, stating that investigators did not find the pieces of the aircraft that would prove the contents of the investigation report.

Dramatization
The accident was featured in a season 7 episode of the Canadian documentary Mayday titled "Scratching the Surface".

See also 
 List of accidents and incidents involving commercial aircraft
 Air India Flight 182, another aviation incident which involved a Boeing 747 that exploded over the North Atlantic
 Pan Am Flight 103, another aviation incident which involved a Boeing 747 that exploded over Lockerbie
 Japan Air Lines Flight 123, another aviation accident, also caused by a faulty tailstrike repair 7 years prior to the accident
 TWA Flight 800, another aviation accident which involved a Boeing 747 that suffered catastrophic hull loss while en route

Notes

Transliterations

References

External links 

Aviation Safety Council

ASC-AOR-05-02-001, the official ASC documents.
English language final report, Volume 1 (Archive) - Alternate link
English language final report, Volume 2 (Archive) - Alternate link
Interim flight safety bulletin
ASC-AOR-05-02-001, official ASC documents in Chinese – Chinese is the original version and the language of reference
Chinese language final report, Volume 1 (Archive) - Alternate link
Chinese language final report, Volume 2 (Archive) - Alternate link
Interim flight safety bulletin
 Ballistic Trajectory Analysis for the CI611 Accident Investigation (Archive)
 Yang, Minghao (楊明浩), Li Baokang (李寶康), Su Shuikao (蘇水灶), and Guan Wenlin (官文霖). "華航CI-611事故調查地理資訊系統整合" [China Airlines CI-611 accident investigation geographic information system integration]  (Archive). - Includes English abstract

China Airlines
 0525 Flight CI 611 Status Updates
 China Airlines Statement on CI 611 Accident Investigation Report

Media
 "China Airlines back in the dock," BBC
 Between the Shores of Life and Death
 Set the Kite Free

Other
 
 Cockpit Voice Recorder transcript and accident summary
 Jiang Expresses Condolence Over Victims of China Airlines Crash (05/27/02)

611
2002 in Taiwan
Accidents and incidents involving the Boeing 747
Airliner accidents and incidents caused by in-flight structural failure
Airliner accidents and incidents caused by maintenance errors
Airliner accidents and incidents involving in-flight depressurization
Aviation accidents and incidents in 2002
Aviation accidents and incidents in Taiwan
Aviation accidents and incidents in the Pacific Ocean
Cross-Strait relations
May 2002 events in Asia
Airliner accidents and incidents caused by tailstrikes
2002 disasters in Taiwan
2002 disasters in Oceania